"Someone Who Can Dance" is a song by Swedish electropop duo Icona Pop. It was written by Elliphant, Jarrad Rogers and Icona Pop, while being produced by Rogers. It was released on 25 February 2016, through TEN Music Group, Atlantic Records and Warner Music Group.

Live performances
On 24 February 2016, Icona Pop performed "Someone Who Can Dance" at the Grammis Gala along with Zara Larsson and Elliphant.

Track listing

Credits and personnel
Credits adapted from Genius.
 Icona Pop – composing, vocals
 Jarrad Rogers - composing, producing, mixing
 Elliphant - composing

Charts

References

2016 singles
2016 songs
Icona Pop songs
Songs written by Aino Jawo
Atlantic Records singles
Songs written by Caroline Hjelt